Polsat Comedy Central Extra is a Polish pay television channel focusing on comedy from Paramount Networks EMEAA. It was launched on 29 April 2010 as a programming block on VH1 Poland. On 14 January 2011, VH1 Poland was rebranded as Comedy Central Family.

On 24 April 2012, VH1 Poland was relaunched, replacing VH1 Europe in Poland.

On 12 June 2012, Comedy Central Family started broadcasting in 16:9 picture format.

On 3 March 2020, the channel was re-branded into Polsat Comedy Central Extra. Comedy Central Family is now only available in Hungary.

Programming
 2 Broke Girls
 According to Jim
 'Allo 'Allo!
 And Who's in Charge Here?
 Blok Ekipa
 The Chairman's Ear
 The Cosby Show
 Daleko od noszy
 Dharma & Greg
 Drunk History
 Everybody Hates Chris
 Everybody Loves Raymond
 Friends
 The Goldbergs
 Graczykowie
 The King of Queens
 Malcolm in the Middle
 The Middle
 Mike and Molly
 Mom
 My Family
 My Wife and Kids
 Niania
 Rick and Morty
 Rodzina zastępcza
 Roseanne
 South Park
 The World According to the Kiepski Family
 What I Like About You (TV series)
 Włatcy móch

References

Comedy Central
Television channels in Poland
Television channels and stations established in 2011